Desires Hotels is an American hotel management company based in Miami, Florida. It was a division of Tecton Hospitality before Tecton merged with Ocean Blue Hospitality in 2010. The merged companies currently operate under the name Trust Hospitality.

Desires Hotels operates a number of hotels, including the Iron Horse Hotel in Milwaukee, Wisconsin. It will manage the hotel in Cassa Hotel & Residences in New York City once the building is complete.

References 

Hospitality companies of the United States
Companies based in Miami